Romualdisca is a genus of moths in the subfamily Arctiinae. It contains the single species Romualdisca dalmeidai, which is found in Brazil.

References

Natural History Museum Lepidoptera generic names catalog

Arctiinae